Patrick McKenna (26 April 1920 – 16 November 1995) was a Scottish football defender. He played for Aberdeen, Plymouth Argyle and St Johnstone. From St Johnstone FC, he moved into the Scottish Highland Football League, firstly, with Keith FC, then onto Fraserburgh FC for four seasons where he finished his professional football career at 40 years of age in May 1960.  McKenna appeared for Aberdeen in one Scottish Cup Final and one Scottish League Cup Final during the late 1940s.

References

External links 

1920 births
1995 deaths
Footballers from Glasgow
Association football defenders
Scottish footballers
Aberdeen F.C. players
Plymouth Argyle F.C. players
St Johnstone F.C. players
Scottish Football League players
English Football League players